Forest Grove is an unincorporated community located in Clark County, Kentucky, United States. It was also known as Germantown. Note that Germantown, Kentucky is not the same place.

References

Unincorporated communities in Clark County, Kentucky
Unincorporated communities in Kentucky